H. Ralph Gunter (August 23, 1891 – 1973) was a politician in the Canadian province of New Brunswick.

He was born in Ludlow, New Brunswick, the son of Herbert and Eliza Gunter. In the 1935 New Brunswick general election he was elected to the Legislative Assembly as the Liberal Party candidate for the multi-member riding of York.

He and his wife Gladys June Gunter née Richards (Welsh) and born in Edmundston, New Brunswick (1891–1974) are buried together in the Fredericton Rural Cemetery.

1891 births
1973 deaths
People from Northumberland County, New Brunswick
New Brunswick Liberal Association MLAs